Suxianling Subdistrict is a subdistrict and the seat of Suxian District in Chenzhou Prefecture-level City, Hunan, China. The subdistrict was formed through the amalgamation of part of Beihu Subdistrict and  part of Nanta Subdistrict in April 1983.

See also 
 List of township-level divisions of Hunan

References

External links 

Suxian District
Subdistricts of Hunan
Township-level divisions of Chenzhou
County seats in Hunan